Thakur Jugal Kishore Sinha (1908–1980) was an Indian politician, member of the first Lok Sabha and independence activist. He was elected as the member of the parliament in the 1st Lok Sabha from Muzaffarpur-North-West Bihar parliamentary constituency in 1953 (present-day Sheohar constituency). He is known as the"Father of cooperative movement" in India for his contribution to the Cooperative Movement in India and on his initiation the cooperative departments in the Government were established and started by the first Prime Minister of India Pandit Jawaharlal Nehru. And his participation in the Indian independence movement was such that he had been imprisoned several times.

He married Ram Dulari Sinha, an independence activist who later became Union Minister and then Governor of Kerala.

Publication
 1932; Edited 'BALIDAN' and 'KARA and KAIDI' (Manuscript) in Motihari Jail, while he was imprisoned for his participation in the freedom movement

References

1908 births
1980 deaths
India MPs 1952–1957
Indian National Congress politicians
Lok Sabha members from Bihar
People from Bihar
People from Sitamarhi district
Indian National Congress politicians from Bihar